Kaiti is a suburb of the New Zealand city of Gisborne. It is located immediately to the east of the city centre, on the opposing bank of the Waimata River.

Kaiti Hill or Titirangi overlooks Poverty Bay with Young Nick's Head (Te Kurī-a-Pāoa) across the Bay. Titirangi also overlooks the city. The Turanganui River is below it, and separates Kaiti from the Gisborne Central Business District.

Kaiti Beach is one of New Zealand's most historic spots, being the landing site of the Horouta waka. It brought ancestors of the tangata whenua to the region. In 1769 Captain James Cook, the first European to have set foot on New Zealand soil, also landed here. The location of this landing is protected as a national reserve.

The name kaiti comes from Māori words meaning "to eat the edible parts of cabbage trees".

Demographics

Kaiti had a population of 7,803 at the 2018 New Zealand census, an increase of 912 people (13.2%) since the 2013 census, and an increase of 279 people (3.7%) since the 2006 census. There were 2,397 households, comprising 3,762 males and 4,050 females, giving a sex ratio of 0.93 males per female, with 2,121 people (27.2%) aged under 15 years, 1,680 (21.5%) aged 15 to 29, 3,018 (38.7%) aged 30 to 64, and 987 (12.6%) aged 65 or older.

Ethnicities were 43.5% European/Pākehā, 67.7% Māori, 7.5% Pacific peoples, 2.7% Asian, and 0.8% other ethnicities. People may identify with more than one ethnicity.

The percentage of people born overseas was 9.1, compared with 27.1% nationally.

Although some people chose not to answer the census's question about religious affiliation, 46.9% had no religion, 35.3% were Christian, 6.5% had Māori religious beliefs, 0.3% were Hindu, 0.3% were Muslim, 0.3% were Buddhist and 1.7% had other religions.

Of those at least 15 years old, 756 (13.3%) people had a bachelor's or higher degree, and 1,284 (22.6%) people had no formal qualifications. 417 people (7.3%) earned over $70,000 compared to 17.2% nationally. The employment status of those at least 15 was that 2,481 (43.7%) people were employed full-time, 783 (13.8%) were part-time, and 447 (7.9%) were unemployed.

Geography

Titirangi Hill

Titirangi Hill is a reserve with a dog walking area, fitness trail, picnic area, playground and lookout spot.

The Kaiti Beach reserve, at the south-west base of the hill, is a beach, local park and dog walking area.

Other parks

Anzac Park includes a barbecue area, boat ramp, football fields, picnic area and playground.

Waikirikiri Reserve is a sports ground, dog walking area and picnic area.

London Street Reserve is a local park and dog walking area.

Marae

Te Poho-o-Rawiri Marae is located in Kaiti. It is a tribal meeting ground of the Ngāti Porou hapū of Ngāti Konohi and Ngāti Oneone, and includes Te Poho o Rawiri meeting house.

In October 2020, the Government committed $1,686,254 from the Provincial Growth Fund to upgrade Te Poho-o-Rawiri Marae and 5 other Rongowhakaata marae, creating an estimated 41 jobs.

Education

All these schools are co-educational. Rolls are as of

References

Suburbs of Gisborne, New Zealand